Armando "Mandy" Romero (born October 29, 1967) is a former Major League Baseball catcher.

Romero is noted for his role as a replacement player during spring training prior to the 1995 Major League Baseball Strike. Replacement players took over for professional baseball players when the Major League Baseball Players Association went on strike. The strike was resolved at the end of spring training. Romero would return to Major League Baseball with the San Diego Padres in 1997, however, was blacklisted and not permitted to join the Major League Baseball Players Association.

Pedro Martinez, Red Sox teammate of Romero, was quoted, "Mandy is a guy that likes to take life by the horns. He lives, he laughs, and most of all, he loves."

External links

Baseball players from Miami
Major League Baseball replacement players
1967 births
Living people
San Diego Padres players
Boston Red Sox players
Colorado Rockies players
Eastern Florida State College people
Major League Baseball catchers
Carolina Mudcats players
Buffalo Bisons (minor league) players
Pawtucket Red Sox players
Norfolk Tides players
Akron Aeros players
Sacramento River Cats players
Nashville Sounds players
Colorado Springs Sky Sox players